Karen R. Lawrence is an American academic administrator serving as the ninth president of The Huntington Library, Art Museum, and Botanical Gardens. She previously served as the 10th president of Sarah Lawrence College.

Early life and education 
Lawrence was born in 1949. She earned a Bachelor of Arts degree in English from Yale University and a master's degree in English literature from Tufts University. Lawrence earned a PhD degree in literature from Columbia University in 1978.

Career 
Lawrence is a scholar of English and Irish literatures. She is also a specialist on the work of James Joyce.

Lawrence began her career as an English professor at the University of Utah and University of California, Irvine.

In August 2007, Lawrence became the 10th President of Sarah Lawrence College, a liberal arts college in Yonkers, New York. At the college, Lawrence was a successful college fundraiser, increased financial aid, and grew the size of the student body at the college. In July 2017, after 10 years as president, Lawrence stepped down.

In September 2018, Lawrence became the 9th President of The Huntington Library, Art Museum, and Botanical Gardens in San Marino, California.

Personal life 
Lawrence's husband is Peter F. Lawrence, a physician. They have two sons.

See also 
 List of presidents of Sarah Lawrence College

References

External links 
 Karen Lawrence at 2015 Commencement
 Karen R. Lawrence at Huntington.org

Heads of universities and colleges in the United States
1949 births
Columbia Graduate School of Arts and Sciences alumni
Living people
People associated with the Huntington Library
Presidents of Sarah Lawrence College
Tufts University School of Arts and Sciences alumni
University of Utah faculty
Yale University alumni